Okha Airport, also known as Novostroyka Airport is an airport in Okha, Russia. The airport is located in the village of Novostroyka, about 10 km south-west of the centre of Okha.  The runway is planned to be extended 300 meters in 2020 as part of a series of modernizations.

Airlines and destinations

References

External links
 Airport Okha (Novostrojka) Aviateka.Handbook

Airports in Sakhalin Oblast